The following highways are numbered 45:

International
 Asian Highway 45
 European route E45
 AH45A|Asian Highway 45A

Burma
National Road 45 (Burma)

Canada
 Alberta Highway 45
 Manitoba Highway 45
 Ontario Highway 45
 Saskatchewan Highway 45

China 
  G45 Expressway
 Asian Highway 45A

Finland
 Finnish national road 45

France
 A45 autoroute (proposed)

Germany
 Bundesautobahn 45

India
  National Highway 45 (India) (Grand Southern Trunk Road)

Iran
 Road 45

Japan
 Japan National Route 45

Korea, South
 Jungbu Naeryuk Expressway
 National Route 45

Mexico
 Mexican Federal Highway 45

New Zealand
 New Zealand State Highway 45

United Kingdom
 British A45 (Birmingham-Thrapston)
 British M45 (Watford Gap-Thurlaston)

United States
 Interstate 45
 U.S. Route 45
 U.S. Route 45E
 U.S. Route 45W
 Alabama State Route 45
 Arkansas Highway 45
 California State Route 45
 Colorado State Highway 45
 Connecticut Route 45
 Florida State Road 45
 Florida State Road 45A
 Georgia State Route 45
 Georgia State Route 45 (former)
 Idaho State Highway 45
 Illinois Route 45 (former)
 Indiana State Road 45
 Iowa Highway 45 (former)
 K-45 (Kansas highway) (former)
 Louisiana Highway 45
 Maryland Route 45
Maryland Route 45A
Maryland Route 45B
Maryland Route 45C
Maryland Route 45D
Maryland Route 45E
 Massachusetts Route 45 (former)
 M-45 (Michigan highway)
 Minnesota State Highway 45
 Missouri Route 45
 Nebraska Highway 45
 Nebraska Link 45B
 Nebraska Spur 45A
 Nevada State Route 45 (former)
 New Hampshire Route 45
 New Jersey Route 45
 County Route 45 (Monmouth County, New Jersey)
 New Mexico State Road 45
 New York State Route 45
 County Route 45 (Cattaraugus County, New York)
 County Route 45A (Cayuga County, New York)
County Route 45B (Cayuga County, New York)
 County Route 45 (Erie County, New York)
 County Route 45 (Genesee County, New York)
 County Route 45 (Greene County, New York)
 County Route 45 (Herkimer County, New York)
 County Route 45 (Jefferson County, New York)
 County Route 45 (Niagara County, New York)
 County Route 45 (Oswego County, New York)
 County Route 45 (Otsego County, New York)
 County Route 45 (Putnam County, New York)
 County Route 45 (Rensselaer County, New York)
 County Route 45 (Saratoga County, New York)
 County Route 45 (St. Lawrence County, New York)
 County Route 45 (Steuben County, New York)
 County Route 45 (Suffolk County, New York)
 County Route 45 (Sullivan County, New York)
 County Route 45A (Sullivan County, New York)
 County Route 45 (Ulster County, New York)
 County Route 45 (Washington County, New York)
 North Carolina Highway 45
 North Dakota Highway 45
 Ohio State Route 45
 Oklahoma State Highway 45
 Pennsylvania Route 45
 South Carolina Highway 45
 South Dakota Highway 45
 Tennessee State Route 45
 Texas State Highway 45
 Texas State Highway Spur 45
 Farm to Market Road 45
 Texas Park Road 45
 Utah State Route 45
 Virginia State Route 45
 West Virginia Route 45
 Wisconsin Highway 45 (former)

See also
A45 (disambiguation)#Roads